Binibining Pilipinas 2021 was the 57th edition of Binibining Pilipinas. Originally scheduled to be held in 2020, the coronation night of the pageant was postponed due to the COVID-19 pandemic and was rescheduled to July 11, 2021 at the Smart Araneta Coliseum in Quezon City, Metro Manila, Philippines with Catriona Gray and Nicole Cordoves as presenters. Due to the restrictions caused by the continuing impacts of the pandemic, several health and safety protocols were implemented to ensure the safety of the artists, candidates, crew and organizers of the event.

At the end of the event, Bea Magtanong and Gazini Ganados crowned Hannah Arnold of Masbate as Binibining Pilipinas International 2021, Maria Andrea Abesamis and Samantha Bernado crowned Samantha Panlilio of Cavite as Binibining Pilipinas Grand International 2021, Emma Tiglao crowned Cindy Obeñita of Cagayan de Oro, Misamis Oriental as Binibining Pilipinas Intercontinental 2021, and Leren Bautista crowned Maureen Montagne of Batangas as Binibining Pilipinas Globe 2021. Gabrielle Camille Basiano of Borongan, Eastern Samar was named 1st Runner-Up and Meiji Cruz of Valenzuela was crowned 2nd Runner-Up.

Starting this edition, the winners of the Binibining Pilipinas pageant will represent the Philippines in Miss International, Miss Grand International, Miss Intercontinental, and The Miss Globe after losing its franchise for Miss Universe and Miss Supranational.

ABS-CBN broadcast the coronation night via Kapamilya Channel and free-to-air channel A2Z (the latter under a partnership with ZOE TV). The pageant was also simulcast on ABS-CBN's Metro Channel and livestreamed on IWantTFC and YouTube.

Results

Color keys
  The contestant won in an International pageant.
  The contestant was a Semi-Finalist in an International pageant.
  The contestant did not place.

§ — Fan Vote Winner

Appointed titleholder 
One of this edition's contestants was appointed to compete internationally who was also a runner-up in the previous edition of Binibining Pilipinas:

Special awards

Judges 
The following served as judges on the coronation night of Binibining Pilipinas 2021:

 Rajo Laurel — Fashion designer
 Pinky Webb — Broadcaster
 Maria Garcia — General Manager of Novotel
 Dioceldo Sy — CEO of Ever Bilena
 Enrique Gil — Actor
 Kylie Verzosa — Miss International 2016
 Liza Soberano — Actress
 Benito Bengzon Jr. — Tourism Undersecretary and Spokesperson

Contestants 
34 contestants competed for the four titles.

Notes

References

2020
2021 beauty pageants
2021 in the Philippines
Beauty pageants in the Philippines
Events postponed due to the COVID-19 pandemic